Djebahia is a town and commune in Bouïra Province, Algeria. According to the 1998 census it has a population of 14,630.

References

Communes of Bouïra Province
Villages in Algeria
Bouïra Province